The final Leeds municipal elections were held on 5 May 1972, with a third of the councillors up for re-election. The wide-reaching reforms set out in the Local Government Act 1972 had scheduled the council's abolition to coincide with its replacement by the enlarged successor Leeds metropolitan district on 1 April 1974. Prior to the election, a by-election had resulted in Labour gaining the seat in Castleton from the Liberals.

Labour repeated all of the gains of the previous year's gains (in the 1971 Leeds City Council election), with the exceptions of the Castleton and Osmondthorpe seats - both of which they already held; the latter being their solitary gain in the 1969 election. Much like Labour's performance in the 1969 election, the Conservatives halted their decline - at least in vote share (like Labour, their total vote actually fell a further 5,000, setting a new party low). Having won full representation in West Hunslet, the Liberals defended the seat and retained their total of four. Turnout fell to 34.4%, from 37.8% the year before.

The reaction from the Labour leader, Albert King, was one of contentment: "This is a satisfactory evening for us, and the gains were more or less in line with what I expected". The Conservatives meanwhile were reported to be relieved, with their leader Frank Marshall commenting that the results were better than expected a couple of months ago, and pointing to a significantly reduced Labour vote in Burley from the year before as a reason for optimism for the future.

The sixteen gains for Labour were enough to re-take control of the council from the Conservatives for its last years of existence.

Election result

The result had the following consequences for the total number of seats on the Council after the elections:

Ward results

References

1972 English local elections
1972
1970s in Leeds